Peter Wirz (born 29 July 1960) is a retired Swiss middle-distance runner who competed primarily in the 1500 metres. He represented his country at the 1984 and 1988 Summer Olympics, as well as two outdoor and one indoor World Championships. In addition, he won a gold medal at the 1984 European Indoor Championships.

International competitions

1Did not finish in the semifinals
2Did not finish in the final

Personal bests
Outdoor
800 metres – 1:47.98 (Bern 1984)
1000 metres – 2:18.37 (Bern 1983)
1500 metres – 3:35.83 (Los Angeles 1984)
One mile – 3:55.68 (London 1986)
2000 metres – 4:58.29 (Langenthal 1984)
3000 metres – 7:44.89 (Seville 1987)
5000 metres – 13:38.23 (Sittard 1989)
Indoor
1500 metres – 3:40.20 (Stuttgart 1985)
2000 metres – 5:06.28 (Sindelfingen 1984)
3000 metres – 7:51.42 (Stuttgart 1989)

References

All-Athletics profile

1960 births
Living people
Swiss male middle-distance runners
Athletes (track and field) at the 1984 Summer Olympics
Athletes (track and field) at the 1988 Summer Olympics
Olympic athletes of Switzerland
World Athletics Championships athletes for Switzerland